Kingdom in the Clouds (Romanian: Tinerețe fără bătrînețe – literal title: Youth Without Old Age) is a Romanian fantasy film from 1969. It was directed and written by Elisabeta Bostan from a story by Petre Ispirescu (Tinerețe fără bătrânețe și viață fără de moarte).

Plot
A young man's quest for a kingdom promising eternal youth and immortality. To reach his goal he must fulfill the three wishes of the Emperor's daughter, retrieve three golden objects, answer three riddles set by the Lord of Time, overcome an evil witch, and escape the Kingdom of Lies ruled by an evil Emperor and the young man's nemesis, the Prince of Lies. In return for good deeds along the way, he is given a magical horn and feather to aid him in his quest and is served by a flying horse, all this before he can finally enter the Kingdom of Youth without Old Age and Life without Death and marry the Emperor's daughter.

Cast
 Carmen Stănescu as Împărăteasa Tinereții
  as Împăratul/Moș Vreme (Lord of Time)
  (as Ana Széles) as Zâna
  as Făt-Frumos
 Nicolae Secăreanu as Împăratul Minciună
  as son of Împăratului Minciună
  as Vrăjitoarea
  as Înțeleptul
 Margareta Pogonat		
 George Motoi (as George Mottoi)
  as Ursitoare	
  (as Eugenia Bosînceanu) as Ursitoare
  (as Zoe Anghel-Stanca) as Ursitoare
 Simona Manda

External links

Films directed by Elisabeta Bostan
1960s Romanian-language films
1969 films
1960s fantasy films
Romanian fantasy films
Films based on fairy tales